Arthur Norman Victor Harcourt Ommundsen (23 November 1878 – 30 September 1915) was a British sport shooter, born in Scandinavia but domiciled in Scotland from a young age, who competed in the 1908 Summer Olympics and 1912 Summer Olympics.

In the 1908 Olympics he won a silver medal in the team military rifle event. Four years later he won a silver medal in the team military rifle event and was seventh in the 600 metre free rifle event.

Ommundsen was killed in action during the First World War, serving as a lieutenant with the Honourable Artillery Company near Ypres. He was buried at Brandhoek Military Cemetery nearby.

See also
 List of Olympians killed in World War I

References

External links
profile

1878 births
1915 deaths
British male sport shooters
Olympic shooters of Great Britain
Shooters at the 1908 Summer Olympics
Shooters at the 1912 Summer Olympics
Olympic silver medallists for Great Britain
Honourable Artillery Company officers
British military personnel killed in World War I
Olympic medalists in shooting
Medalists at the 1908 Summer Olympics
Medalists at the 1912 Summer Olympics
British Army personnel of World War I